Robert or Rob Bell may refer to:

Arts and entertainment
 Robert Charles Bell (engraver) (1806–1872), Scottish engraver
 Robert Anning Bell (1863–1933), English artist and designer
 Robert Bell (artist and curator) (1946–2018), Australian artist and curator
 Robert "Kool" Bell (born 1950), American singer, songwriter, and bassist with Kool & the Gang
 Robert Bell, musician and bassist with The Blue Nile
 Rob Bell (TV presenter) (born 1979), British TV presenter

Authors and editors
 Robert Bell (writer) (1800–1867), Irish journalist & editor
 Robert Charles Bell (1917–2002), author of several books on board games
 Rob Bell (Robert Holmes Bell Jr., born 1970), American author, Christian speaker and pastor

Law
 Robert C. Bell (1880–1964), U.S. federal judge
 Robert M. Bell (born 1943), Chief Judge of the Maryland Court of Appeals
 Robert Holmes Bell (born 1944), U.S. federal judge
 Robert D. Bell (born 1967), justice of the Oklahoma Court of Civil Appeals

Politics
 Robert Bell (Speaker) (died 1577), British statesman
 Robert Bell (died 1639) (1589–1639), English landowner and politician
 Robert Bell (Lanark County politician) (1808–1894), Canadian legislator
 Robert Bell (Ottawa politician) (1821–1873), Canadian legislator
 Robert Bell (Toronto politician) (1827–1883), Orangeman and legislator in Ontario, Canada
 Robert Duncan Bell (1878–1953), acting governor of Bombay during the British Raj, 1937
 Robert Bell (Minnesota politician) (1926–2014), Minnesota politician
 Robert Bell (Australian politician) (1950–2001), Australian politician
 Robert Christopher Bell or Chris Bell (born 1959), U.S. Representative from Texas
 Rob Bell (Virginia politician) (born 1967), member of the Virginia House of Delegates

Science
 Robert Bell (geologist) (1841–1917), Canadian geologist
 Robert Bell (Irish geologist) (1864–1934), Northern Irish amateur geologist
 Robert E. Bell (1914–2006), American archaeologist
 Robert Edward Bell (1918–1992), Canadian nuclear physicist and principal of McGill University
 Robert James Bell (born 1975), known as Dr Rob, scientist, and host of Australian children's television programme Scope

Sports
 Robert William Bell (1875–1950), England international rugby player
 Bunny Bell (Robert Bell, 1911–1988), English footballer who played for Tranmere Rovers and Everton
 Bobby Bell (Scottish footballer) (Robert McDicken Bell, 1934–2007), association football player for various English and Scottish clubs
 Robert Lee Bell Jr. (Bobby Bell, born 1940), American football player
 Rob Bell (baseball) (Robert Allen Bell, born 1977), US Major League/Minor League baseball player
 Robert Bell (racing driver) (born 1979), British racing driver

Others
 Robert Bell (publisher) (1732–1784), American printer and publisher
 Robert Bell (priest) (1808–1883), Archdeacon of Cashel
Robert Bell (physician) (1845–1926), British physician and medical writer
 Robert J. T. Bell (1876–1963), Scottish mathematician
 Robert Huntley Bell (born 1946), American academic

See also
 Bob Bell (disambiguation)